John Gadbury (1627–1704) was an English astrologer, and a prolific writer of almanacs and on other related topics. Initially a follower or disciple, and a defender in the 1650s, of William Lilly, he eventually turned against Lilly and denounced him in 1675 as fraudulent.

His 1652 work Philastrogus Knavery Epitomized was a reply to Lillies Ape Whipt by the pseudonymous Philastrogus, defending Lilly, Nicholas Culpeper and others.

His father William was an estate worker for Sir John Curson of Waterperry House near Wheatley, Oxfordshire, who eloped with Frances, a daughter of the house, a year before John's birth. However, John Gadbury persuaded his grandfather Sir John to put him through Oxford, before his astrological training.

He became a High Tory and Catholic convert. He had a number of brushes with the authorities: imprisonment (wrongful) at the time of the Popish Plot and suspicion later of plotting against William III of England; also trouble for omitting Guy Fawkes Day from his almanacs. He feuded with fellow astrologer John Partridge, a supporter of the Whigs.

See also
Heliocentric astrology

Notes

Sources
Concise Dictionary of National Biography

External links

  NAUTHICUM ASTROLOGICUM, JOHN GADBURY (PDF 22,2 MB)
  The Doctrine of Nativites and Horary QUestions, JOHN GADBURY (PDF 41,2 MB)
  The Nativity of Lewis the Fourteenth, JOHN GADBURY (PDF 32 MB)

1627 births
1704 deaths
English astrologers
17th-century astrologers
English Roman Catholics
17th-century English politicians
Converts to Roman Catholicism from Anglicanism
English astrological writers